Danielle Elizabeth Tumminio Hansen (born 1981) is a writer, intellectual, practical theologian, and Episcopal priest whose expertise is in the intersection of spirituality and cultural life.  She has taught courses at Yale University, Tufts University, the University of New Haven, and Central Connecticut State University.  She is currently a professor in the areas of practical and pastoral theology at Emory University.  She was born in Manhattan.

Research on surrogacy, reproductive loss, infertility, and family
Tumminio Hansen published the first comprehensive practical theology of infertility, reproductive loss, and surrogacy in 2019.  Conceiving Family is an interdisciplinary study that utilizes ethnographic, feminist, womanist, philosophical and practical theological sources to argue for a vision of family defined by relationships and not biology.  Tumminio Hansen proposes that surrogacy should be a mutual decision made between surrogate and intended family that supports the identity construction of each party and any resulting children.  The conclusion of that book expands this model of reproductive surrogacy to non-reproductive realms in which individuals function as surrogates (proxies) for one another.

Research on sexual violations

Tumminio Hansen believes that the terms most commonly used for sexual violations—including “rape” and “sexual assault”—fail to represent the scope of sexual harm, especially among marginalized populations and when harm fails to represent rape scripts and stereotypes.  She proposes in “Absent a Word” that the linguistic gaps in matters of sexual violations instantiate concrete harm to victims.

In “Remembering Rape in Heaven,” Tumminio Hansen argues against Miroslav Volf’s proposal that trauma must be forgotten in the eschaton.  She suggests that such a proposal raises serious concerns concerning victim epistemic credibility, divine beneficence, and the purpose of remembering the biblical corpus.  Harkening to the work of Marilyn McCord Adams, Tumminio Hansen concludes that it is possible to hold an eschatological vision that preserves victim memory.

Christianity and Harry Potter
Tumminio Hansen is the author of God and Harry Potter at Yale: Teaching Faith and Fantasy Fiction in an Ivy League Classroom and was the instructor of the "Christian Theology and Harry Potter" seminar at Yale University from the spring of 2008 until 2013.  She also repeated the course several times at Tufts University.  Tumminio Hansen has also presented material on the intersection between theology and the Harry Potter series at the Infinitus Symposium in Orlando, Florida in 2010, the Portus Symposium in Dallas, Texas, in the summer of 2008, and she chaired the panel on Harry Potter and Religion at the 2008 American Academy of Religion conference.  Her teaching has been praised by Harry Potter commentator John Granger on his Hogwarts Professor website.

Tumminio Hansen stands in opposition to those in Christian circles who call the Harry Potter series heretical based upon the characters' use of witchcraft.  She has said that in order to consider whether they truly are heretical, Christians must analyze whether the writings of J. K. Rowling violate a number of core theological doctrines, including sin, evil, sacrifice, and grace.  In 2008, she offered an innovative seminar at Yale in order to offer students an opportunity for sustained discussion about the status of the series.  Over 90 students sought to enroll, and the course quickly gained international attention from media sources including CNN; in subsequent years, it became one of the university's most popular seminar offerings and inspired other courses across the country.  She later used that sustained discussion as the basis for her first book, God and Harry Potter at Yale: Teaching Faith and Fantasy Fiction in an Ivy League Classroom.  She has maintained that the books are not heretical and are in fact powerful tools for teaching theology to curious academics, seekers, and faithful Christians.

Popular publications
Tumminio has authored numerous editorials and feature articles on the intersection of spirituality and culture as well as on contemporary issues in the lives of women and mothers.  Her work has appeared in publications including CNN's Belief Blog, The Guardian, The Christian Century, State of Formation, and the Yale Daily News.  She was a regular blogger on issues in contemporary spirituality for Huffington Post.

She was also a regular contributor to Felicity Huffman's What The Flicka website, where she wrote about spirituality in the lives of women and mothers prior to its removal during the College Admissions Scandal.

She has also appeared several times on the television show "Sister Wives," and her article about visiting a Mormon temple went viral. in the Mormon community.

Appearances
Tumminio Hansen has been interviewed by numerous national and international media outlets.  Her take on Christianity's role in the Harry Potter series has been featured on televised broadcasts including CNN, Today Show Australia, and the national Canadian news talk show Connect with Mark Kelley.  She has also appeared in radio broadcasts, including the Colin McEnroe Show and the nationally syndicated Bob and Sheri Show.  Her interviews have been featured in print publications including Christianity Today, and Ministry Values.

In 2011, Tumminio Hansen appeared twice as a guest on the television show Sister Wives. On the show, she asked the family questions about their marriage and religion and arranged for them to speak in an academic context.

Religious upbringing and commitments
Tumminio Hansen is ordained in the Episcopal Church of the United States, the tradition in which she was raised.  She grew up singing in the girls' choir of the Episcopal Cathedral of the Incarnation, which she credits for giving her extensive biblical, theological, and musical training at an early age.  She sang during her college and graduate school years with the choir of Christ Church in New Haven, Connecticut.  She also was a member of the Yale Glee Club.  She credits music as a powerful force in her spiritual life.

Education
Tumminio Hansen is a three-time graduate of Yale University, where she studied with prominent theologians Marilyn McCord Adams, Emilie Townes, Miroslav Volf, and Serene Jones.  She pursued doctoral studies at Boston University, beginning in 2008 under the direction of Shelly Rambo and Bryan Stone where she researched trauma, feminist theology, reproduction, and restorative justice.  At Boston University, she studied with Elie Wiesel.

Life and career coaching
Tumminio Hansen is a licensed life and career coach and is certified through CoachU.  As a coach, she works with clients across North America.

References

1981 births
21st-century American Episcopalians
21st-century American theologians
Women Christian theologians
21st-century Anglican priests
21st-century Anglican theologians
Academics from New York (state)
American Episcopal theologians
Boston University alumni
Life coaches
Living people
Writers from Manhattan
Practical theologians
Yale University alumni
21st-century American women writers
Yale University faculty
Tufts University faculty
University of New Haven faculty
Central Connecticut State University faculty
American women academics